The Factory is a 2012 American crime thriller film directed by Morgan O'Neill and starring John Cusack, Mae Whitman, Dallas Roberts, Mageina Tovah, Cindy Sampson, and Jennifer Carpenter. In the film, Cusack plays a Buffalo, New York cop who has been chasing a serial kidnapper who abducts young women.

Plot 
In Buffalo, New York, a man named Carl picks up a woman he thinks is a prostitute and takes her to his home. When he spots that she is transgender, he angrily murders her, cuts up the body, and places the pieces in a freezer. Meanwhile, Mike Fletcher, a detective, becomes obsessed with the case, which is under threat of being shut down due to its inactivity. A troubled Thanksgiving holiday dinner reveals that he has been ignoring his family, including his rebellious daughter, Abby. Following an argument with her mother, Abby sneaks out of the house to be with her boyfriend Tad. At the diner where he works, Tad breaks up with her, and Abby runs outside. Tad sees her talk to a person in a car; when he next looks, she has disappeared. Carl kidnaps Abby and chains her up in his basement, where he keeps two other young women prisoner, Brittany and Lauren, who suffer from Stockholm syndrome.

Mike and his partner, Kelsey Walker, immediately investigate Abby's disappearance. Although he initially denies any knowledge of Abby's disappearance, Tad shows up at the police station the next day and identifies Darrell, a former suspect and Carl's co-conspirator, who he saw at the diner. Mike and Kelsey interrogate Darrell, but Mike physically assaults him and is taken off the case. Mike breaks into Darrell's house and finds a list of pharmaceuticals that Darrell has supplied to Carl, before Kelsey shows up to back him up. He takes the list to the hospital and has a brief conversation with Carl, who works as a cook there. Darrell's boss tells Mike that Darrell has not shown up for work and the list of drugs is written by a non-professional. Mike calls the company on the back of the list in the hope of finding him, but they are too busy to immediately respond.

That night, a snow storm shuts down the airport and forces Darrell to stay in town. Mike and Kelsey track Darrell to a hotel but find Darrell dead and circumstantial evidence planted by Carl pointing to him as the kidnapper. Mike receives a call from the company, which turns out to be a catering company. He pieces that together with details of Carl's description by a would-be victim and realizes that Carl is the killer. He and Kelsey make their way to Carl's house as Kelsey reports it over the phone. Meanwhile, Abby, who had framed Brittany for breaking Carl's rules, convinces him that Brittany was just celebrating the fact she is pregnant, and Abby takes Brittany's place for a special dinner he had planned; she uses this opportunity to stab him with a corkscrew. Carl throws her back into the basement, where a pregnant Lauren's water has broken. Due to her immobility, she asks Abby to help cut the baby out.

Mike and Kelsey arrive at the house and find plenty of evidence, including a nursery with several babies in it. They hear noises from below, and, searching for the basement, Mike briefly talks to Abby over the house intercom. Abby tells him that Carl keeps the basement door key around his neck. Mike confronts and shoots Carl, but Kelsey picks up Carl's discarded shotgun and shoots Mike, revealing that she was with Carl the entire time (as she was Carl's first victim); her infertility left them unable to have children, so he set up the operation to kidnap prostitutes and force them to have children. Carl dies, but before Kelsey kills Mike, he reveals that Abby is pregnant. Kelsey frees Abby and takes Lauren's just-born baby, assuring them that they're safe. The police find Carl's nursery, which is now empty. Weeks later, Kelsey, using a new name, is shown to have moved to another city with the missing babies. She leaves a phone message to Abby in which she congratulates Abby on her expectant motherhood, which Abby later listens to, including the sound of a baby crying in the background.

Cast 
 John Cusack as Mike Fletcher
 Jennifer Carpenter as Kelsey Walker
 Mae Whitman as Abby Fletcher
 Sonya Walger as Shelly Fletcher
 Dallas Roberts as Carl
 Mageina Tovah as Brittany
 Katherine Waterston as Lauren
 Michael Trevino as Tad
 Gary Anthony Williams as Darryl
 Ksenia Solo as Emma
 Maxim Roy as Head nurse
 Vincent Messina as Jed
 Conrad Pla as Steve
 Cindy Sampson as Crystal
 Glenda Braganza as Nurse

Production 
The film was shot in Montreal, Quebec in 2008.

Release
The Factory was scheduled to be released on December 19, 2011, but it was never theatrically released by Dark Castle Entertainment via Warner Bros. The company then considered a DVD release for the third quarter of 2012, but the film was finally released on February 19, 2013.

Reception 
Jason Jenkins of Dread Central rated it 1/5 stars and called it "an overly familiar, listless thriller-without-thrills, full of bad writing and actors who know better." Lauren Taylor of Bloody Disgusting rated it 3/5 stars and wrote, "While it has a very great lull for the majority of running time, the ending of The Factory is worth the watch." Rohit Rao of DVD Talk rated it 2.5/5 stars and called it "a cookie cutter thriller" with a "supremely dumb, bone-headed twist". Patrick Bromley of DVD Verdict wrote, "The movie only gets sillier and stupider as it goes along, leading to a climax that's utterly ridiculous and abandons any goodwill the movie might have built up to that point." Scott Weinberg of Fearnet wrote, "The Factory is composed of seven or eight other films you've already seen before. And not composed especially well."

See also 
 Gary Heidnik kidnapped 6 young women, killing 2, while keeping them in a basement.
 2013 Cleveland missing trio, three young women abducted and kept in captivity for years, who bore children of their kidnapper
 Kidnapping of Jaycee Lee Dugard, 1991 kidnapping of 11-year-old girl in California, who when found 18 years later had borne her kidnapper's two daughters

References

External links 
 
 

2012 films
2012 crime thriller films
American crime thriller films
Films set in New York (state)
Films shot in Montreal
Dark Castle Entertainment films
Silver Pictures films
Warner Bros. films
Films directed by Morgan O'Neill
Films produced by Joel Silver
Films scored by Mark Isham
2010s English-language films
2010s American films